The Hoosier National Forest is a property managed by the United States Forest Service in the hills of southern 
Indiana. Hoosier National Forest's headquarters are located in Bedford, with a regional office in Tell City. Prominent places within the Forest include the Lick Creek Settlement, Potts Creek Rockshelter Archeological Site, and Jacob Rickenbaugh House.

History
Hoosier National Forest was first touched by humanity 12,000 years ago, when Native Americans in the United States hunted in the forest. Europeans reached the forest in the late 17th century, and began building villages in the forest. Actual lumbering began in the 19th century, with the cutting of more difficult terrain occurring after 1865. By 1910 most of the area had been cut. In the early 1930s the governor of Indiana pushed for the federal government to do something with the eroding lands that saw its residents leaving, with the act being accomplished on February 6, 1935.

Within Hoosier National Forest, two miles (3 km) south of Chambersburg, lies the former Lick Creek Settlement Site, a settlement of free blacks led by the Quaker Jonathan Lindley from around 1819 to around 1865. 
Pioneer Mothers Memorial Forest near Paoli contains an excellent example of virgin forest.  Hemlock Cliffs Recreation Area in Crawford County contains one of the most scenic hiking trails in Indiana.

Most of Thomas Hines' Hines' Raid was within the present-day Hoosier National Forest.

Hickory Ridge Lookout Tower is the sole remaining fire tower out of eight that once stood within Hoosier National Forest. When built, there was a two-room house for the ranger and his dependents to live within, but it has since been destroyed. Visitors may still climb the tower, but are recommended to be cautious when climbing.

Maumee Scout Reservation and Lake Tarzian are also located within the Hoosier National Forest. Lake Tarzian is named after Sarkes Tarzian who led the capital campaign to build the camp.

Science

Much of Hoosier National Forest is over karst, responsible for the many caves in southern Indiana.

Included in Hoosier National Forest is the Charles C. Deam Wilderness Area, the only recognized wilderness area left in Indiana. This means that no motorized vehicles are allowed in the area, and instead mules and horses must be used to maintain hiking trails.

In the Clover Lick Barrens, the southern portion of Hoosier National Forest near the Ohio River, the vegetation is more typical of that found on prairies in the Great Plains. This was discovered by a botanist and biologist from the Indiana Department of Natural Resources, who later found that in the first recorded survey of the area in 2005, the land was described not as forest, but as "a mile of poor barrens and grassy hills". It is believed that the inability of tall oaks to grow in the area allows for this prairie vegetation to persist in such an unlikely location. In 2006 a conscious effort was made to keep the barren look to the area; previous federal efforts on renovating Hoosier National Forest meant adding nonnative species to low-growth areas. It was around Clover Lick in 1972 that Indiana decided to reintroduce wild turkeys back to Indiana, dedicating  for the purpose.

Also found in Hoosier National Forest is Sundance Lake, a  lake.

Hoosier National Forest lies in parts of nine counties in southern Indiana.

Recreation
The trail system has almost , and allows horseback riding and mountain bikes, along with hiking. Hikers are to yield to horses, and mountain bikers are to yield to both of them. Within the Hemlock Cliffs Valley, located within the central portion of the National Forest, there is the 1.2 mile Hemlock Cliffs trail. The trail is noted as access to sandstone cliffs and seasonal waterfalls as well as Hemlock trees and rare wintergreen plants.

Hoosier National Forest Trail System

All trail locations are within the great state of Indiana.

See also
Charles C. Deam Wilderness Area

References

External links

 
National Forests of Indiana
Protected areas of Brown County, Indiana
Protected areas of Lawrence County, Indiana
Protected areas of Perry County, Indiana
Protected areas of Crawford County, Indiana
Protected areas of Dubois County, Indiana
Protected areas of Monroe County, Indiana
Protected areas of Orange County, Indiana
Protected areas of Jackson County, Indiana
Protected areas of Martin County, Indiana
1961 establishments in Indiana
Protected areas established in 1961